Kerly Théus (born 7 January 1999) is a Haitian footballer who plays as a goalkeeper for Aigle Brillant AC and the Haiti women's national team.

Career
Théus was a member of the Haiti under-20 national team, appearing for the team in all three matches of the 2018 FIFA U-20 Women's World Cup, the team's first ever major women's international tournament. She has appeared for the senior Haiti national team, including in the 2020 CONCACAF Women's Olympic Qualifying Championship against the United States on 28 January 2020.

References

External links
 
 
 

1999 births
Living people
Women's association football goalkeepers
Haitian women's footballers
People from Ouest (department)
Haiti women's international footballers
Santiago Morning footballers
Haitian expatriate footballers
Haitian expatriate sportspeople in Chile
Expatriate women's footballers in Chile